Nueltin Lake (Chipewyan: , meaning "sleeping island lake") straddles the Manitoba-Nunavut border in Canada. The lake is split into two parts by a set of narrows. It is drained by the Thlewiaza River.

History
Ilya Andreyevich Tolstoy, the grandson of count Leo Tolstoy, stayed at the Revillon Frères Post of Windy Lake by Nueltin Lake in the winter of 1928–1929. He was in a group attempting to get film footage of the migrating caribou for the William Douglas Burden and William C. Chanler's production, The Silent Enemy, one of the last and greatest of the silent films, released in 1930.

The American naturalist, Francis Harper (biologist) with funding from the United States National Science Foundation, undertook a study of the barren-ground caribou in 1947 in the Nueltin Lake area with research assistants, including Farley Mowat, resulting in the publication of Harper's book entitled Caribou of Keewatin. Inuit artist Luke Anowtalik, who was fifteen at the time, was featured in this publication.

In 1949, the Government of Canada forcibly relocated an Inuit group, the Ihalmiut, to Nueltin from Ennadai Lake but the hunting was poor and they did not stay in the Nueltin area.

See also
List of lakes of Nunavut
List of lakes of Canada
P. G. Downes

References

Lakes of Kivalliq Region
Lakes of Manitoba
Borders of Nunavut
Borders of Manitoba
Former populated places in the Kivalliq Region